Weldon is a census-designated place (CDP) in Kern County, California, United States. It sits at the southeast tip of Lake Isabella. The population was 2,642 at the 2010 census, up from 2,387 at the 2000 census.

Geography

History
The Weldon post office opened in 1871. The name honors William B. Weldon, a cattle rancher. Camp Leonard, a temporary army camp, was established at Weldon in 1863.

The 1941 western film Doomed Caravan was partially filmed in Weldon. Other movies filmed here include Borderland (1937), In Old Mexico (1938) and Hidden Gold (1940).

Demographics

2010
At the 2010 census Weldon had a population of 2,642. The racial makeup of Weldon was 2,375 (89.9%) White, 5 (0.2%) African American, 82 (3.1%) Native American, 11 (0.4%) Asian, 1 (0.0%) Pacific Islander, 53 (2.0%) from other races, and 115 (4.4%) from two or more races. Hispanic or Latino of any race were 217 people (8.2%).

The census reported that 2,636 people (99.8% of the population) lived in households, no one lived in non-institutionalized group quarters and 6 (0.2%) were institutionalized.

There were 1,167 households, 254 (21.8%) had children under the age of 18 living in them, 541 (46.4%) were opposite-sex married couples living together, 117 (10.0%) had a female householder with no husband present, 78 (6.7%) had a male householder with no wife present.  There were 78 (6.7%) unmarried opposite-sex partnerships, and 18 (1.5%) same-sex married couples or partnerships. 351 households (30.1%) were one person and 179 (15.3%) had someone living alone who was 65 or older. The average household size was 2.26.  There were 736 families (63.1% of households); the average family size was 2.74.

The age distribution was 484 people (18.3%) under the age of 18, 178 people (6.7%) aged 18 to 24, 443 people (16.8%) aged 25 to 44, 856 people (32.4%) aged 45 to 64, and 681 people (25.8%) who were 65 or older.  The median age was 50.7 years. For every 100 females, there were 98.3 males.  For every 100 females age 18 and over, there were 100.0 males.

There were 1,583 housing units at an average density of 59.1 per square mile, of the occupied units 901 (77.2%) were owner-occupied and 266 (22.8%) were rented. The homeowner vacancy rate was 4.2%; the rental vacancy rate was 7.8%.  1,923 people (72.8% of the population) lived in owner-occupied housing units and 713 people (27.0%) lived in rental housing units.

2000
At the 2000 census there were 2,387 people, 1,087 households, and 703 families living in the CDP. The racial makeup of the CDP was 91.33% White, 0.42% Black or African American, 3.94% Native American, 0.46% Asian, 0.13% Pacific Islander, 0.88% from other races, and 2.85% from two or more races.  6.24% of the population were Hispanic or Latino of any race.
Of the 1,087 households 19.2% had children under the age of 18 living with them, 51.2% were married couples living together, 9.8% had a female householder with no husband present, and 35.3% were non-families. 30.6% of households were one person and 18.6% were one person aged 65 or older.  The average household size was 2.20 and the average family size was 2.73.

The age distribution was 20.3% under the age of 18, 2.8% from 18 to 24, 17.6% from 25 to 44, 28.3% from 45 to 64, and 31.0% 65 or older.  The median age was 52 years. For every 100 females, there were 97.3 males.  For every 100 females age 18 and over, there were 93.4 males.

The median household income was $22,857 and the median family income  was $26,500. Males had a median income of $35,573 versus $20,208 for females. The per capita income for the CDP was $15,243.  About 14.9% of families and 18.7% of the population were below the poverty line, including 23.7% of those under age 18 and 13.6% of those age 65 or over.

References

Census-designated places in Kern County, California
Kern River Valley
Populated places in the Sierra Nevada (United States)
Census-designated places in California